Oasis of Shalimar is a novel by F. J. Thwaites.

It was adapted for radio in the 1960s.

References

External links
Oasis of Shalimar at AustLit

1950 Australian novels